1981–82 was the 35th season of the Western International Hockey League.

Standings

 Cranbrook Royals		44		29	14	 1							 59
 Trail Smoke Eaters		44		27	16	 1							 55
 Kimberley Dynamiters		44		21	20	 3							 45
 Nelson Maple Leafs 		44		17	26	 1							 35
 Elk Valley Blazers		44		13	31	 0							 26

Playoffs

Semi finals

Best of 7

 Cranbrook Royals defeated Nelson Maple Leafs 4 games to 2 (2-6, 2-4, 5-3, 4-2, 6-3, 3-1)
 Kimberley Dynamiters defeated Trail Smoke Eaters 4 games to 2 (8-6, 7-2, 3-10, 2-5, 5-4, 5-1)

Final
In the "Best of 7" final series, Cranbrook Royals defeated Kimberley Dynamiters 4 games to 1 (8-2, 6-7 OT, 6-3, 8-5, 8-3) to advance to the 1981-82 Western Canada Allan Cup Playoffs.

References 

Western International Hockey League seasons
WIHL